Police 2020 is a one-off television pilot, first broadcast in 1997, that was set to be the first episode of an ongoing British crime drama series. Set in the near future, the pilot starred Liam Cunningham as DCI Billy O'Connell, the head of a police nightshift force, who is tasked with tackling an armed suspect, Eddie Longshaw (Keith Barron), who takes a group of Russian immigrants hostage in an elevator after blaming the immigrant population for an outbreak of tuberculosis that took the lives of most of his family.

However, whilst conducting his investigation, O'Connell and a close colleague, Marsha Beagley (Rachel Davies), are both in the process of competing for a promotion, and are being monitored throughout the crisis to see who performs better, unaware that their superiors are taking advantage of the situation to pit them against each other. Although the feature-length pilot gained much press attention, a full series was not commissioned.

Cast
 Liam Cunningham as DCI Billy O'Connell
 Rachel Davies as DCI Marsha Beagley
 Tim Dantay as DI Brian Sagar
 Maureen Hibbert as DI Christine Baker
 Nick Reding as DS Keanan
 Ken Bradshaw as DS Dewhurst
 Jane Slavin as DC Fiona Muir
 Stephen Hackett as DC Steven Springfield
 Saira Todd as Katline Voikevich
 Keith Barron as Eddie Longshaw
 Ken Bones as Commander Johnson
 Esther Hall as Julie Ostrovsky
 Velibor Topic as Mikki Ostrovsky
 Andrew Knott as Scully
 Rad Lazar as Uri Pacovsky
 Ivan Marevich as Andreyev
 David Prosho as Dr. Fortnum

References

External links
 

1997 television films
1997 films
1997 drama films
Television pilots not picked up as a series
1990s British films
British drama television films